The United States census of 2000, conducted by the Census Bureau, determined the resident population of the United States on April 1, 2000, to be 281,421,906, an increase of 13.2 percent over the 248,709,873 people enumerated during the 1990 census. This was the twenty-second federal census and was at the time the largest civilly administered peacetime effort in the United States.

Approximately 16 percent of households received a "long form" of the 2000 census, which contained over 100 questions. Full documentation on the 2000 census, including census forms and a procedural history, is available from  the Integrated Public Use Microdata Series.

This was the first census in which a stateCaliforniarecorded a population of over 30 million, as well as the first in which two statesCalifornia and Texasrecorded populations of more than 20 million.

Data availability
Microdata from the 2000 census is freely available through the Integrated Public Use Microdata Series. Aggregate data for small areas, together with electronic boundary files, can be downloaded from the National Historical Geographic Information System.
Personally identifiable information will be available in 2072.

State rankings

City rankings

Top 100

Population profile

The U.S. resident population includes the total number of people in the 50 states and the District of Columbia. The Bureau also enumerated the residents of the U.S. territory of Puerto Rico; its population was 3,808,610, an 8.1% increase over the number from a decade earlier.

In an introduction to a more detailed population profile (see references below), the Census Bureau highlighted the following facts about U.S. population dynamics:
 75% of respondents said they were White or Caucasian and no other race;
 Hispanics accounted for 12.5% of the U.S. population, up from 9% in 1990;
 12.4% (34.5 million Americans) were of German descent;
 12.3% were of Black or African American descent;
 3.6% of respondents were Asian;
 2.4% (6.8 million Americans) of respondents were multiracial (2 or more races). The 2000 census was the first time survey options for multiracial Americans were provided.
 Between 1990 and 2000, the population aged 45 to 54 grew by 49% and those aged 85 and older grew 38%;
 Women outnumbered men two to one among those aged 85 and older;
 Almost one in five adults had some type of disability in 1997 and the likelihood of having a disability increased with age;
 Families (as opposed to men or women living alone) still dominated American households, but less so than they did thirty years ago;
 Since 1993, both families and non-families have seen median household incomes rise, with "households headed by a woman without a spouse present" growing the fastest;
 People in married-couple families had the lowest poverty rates;
 The poor of any age were more likely than others to lack health insurance coverage;
 The number of elementary and high school students in 2000 fell just short of the all-time high of 49 million reached in 1970;
 Improvements in educational attainment cross racial and ethnic lines; and
 The majority (51%) of U.S. households had access to computers; 42% had Internet access.

Changes in population

Regionally, the South and West experienced the bulk of the nation's population increase: 14,790,890 and 10,411,850, respectively. This meant that the mean center of U.S. population moved to Phelps County, Missouri. The Northeastern United States grew by 2,785,149; the Midwest by 4,724,144.

(maps not to scale)

Reapportionment

The results of the census are used to determine how many congressional districts each state is apportioned. Congress defines the formula, in accordance with Title 2 of the U.S. Code, to reapportion among the states the 435 seats in the United States House of Representatives. The apportionment population consists of the resident population of the fifty states, plus the overseas military and federal civilian employees and their dependents living with them who could be allocated to a state. Each member of the House represents a population of about 647,000. The populations of the District of Columbia and Puerto Rico are excluded from the apportionment population because they do not have voting seats in the U. S. House of Representatives.

Since the first census in 1790, the decennial count has been the basis for the United States representative form of government. Article I, Section II specifies that "The Number of Representatives shall not exceed one for every thirty Thousand, but each State shall have at Least one Representative." In 1790, each member of the House represented about 34,000 residents. Since then, the House more than quadrupled in size, and in 1911 the number of representatives was fixed at 435. Today, each member represents about 20 times as many constituents.

Adjustment controversy

In the years leading up to the 2000 census, there was substantial controversy over whether the Bureau should adjust census figures based on a follow-up survey, called the post-enumeration survey, of a sample of blocks. (In 1999, the Supreme Court ruled 5–4 that the Constitution prohibits the use of such figures for apportionment purposes, but it may be permissible for other purposes where feasible.) The controversy was partly technical, but also partly political, since based on data from the 1990 census both parties believed that adjustment would likely have the effect, after redistricting, of slightly increasing Democratic representation in legislative bodies, but would also give Utah an additional, probably Republican, representative to Congress.

Following the census, discrepancies between the adjusted census figures and demographic estimates of population change could not be resolved in time to meet legal deadlines for the provision of redistricting data, and the Census Bureau therefore recommended that the unadjusted results be used for this purpose. This recommendation was followed by the Secretary of Commerce (the official in charge of making the determination).

Utah controversy
After the census was tabulated, Utah challenged the results in two different ways. Utah was extremely close to gaining a fourth congressional seat, falling 857 people short, which in turn was allocated to North Carolina. The margin was later shortened to 80 people, after the federal government discovered that it overcounted the population of North Carolina by 2,673 residents. The Census Bureau counted members of the military and other federal civilian employees serving abroad as residents of their home state but did not count other people living outside the United States. Utah claimed that people traveling abroad as religious missionaries should be counted as residents and that the failure to do so imposed a burden on Mormon religious practice. Almost half of all Mormon missionaries, more than 11,000 people, were from Utah; only 102 came from North Carolina. If this policy were changed, then Utah would have received an additional seat instead of North Carolina. On November 26, 2002, the Supreme Court affirmed the lower court ruling that rejected Utah's efforts to have Mormon missionaries counted.

The state of Utah then filed another lawsuit alleging that the statistical methods used in computing the state populations were improper and cost Utah the seat. The Bureau uses a method called imputation to assign a number of residents to addresses where residents cannot be reached after multiple efforts. While nationwide the imputation method added 0.4% to the population, the rate in Utah was 0.2%. The state challenged that the use of imputation violates the Census Act of 1957 and that it also fails the Constitution's requirement in Article I, Section 2 that an "actual enumeration" be used for apportionment. This case, Utah v. Evans, made it to the Supreme Court, but Utah was again defeated.

Gay and lesbian controversy

The census forms did not include any questions regarding sexual orientation, making it impossible to compile data comparing heterosexual and homosexual populations. However, two questions were asked that allowed same-sex partnerships to be counted. The questionnaires asked the sex of each person in a household and they asked what the relationship was between each of the members of the household. Respondents could check "Husband/wife" or "unmarried partner" or a number of other relationships. Responses were tabulated and the Census Bureau reported that there were more than 658,000 same-sex couples heading households in the United States. However, only about 25% of gay men and 40% of lesbians are in shared-household partnerships at any one time, according to non-census surveys. For every same-sex couple tallied in the census, there could be three to six more homosexual un-partnered individuals who would not be counted as gay. The census reported that same-sex male couples numbered 336,001 and female same-sex couples numbered 329,522. Extrapolating from those figures and the surveyed partnering habits of homosexuals, as many as 4.3 million homosexual adults could have been living in the U.S. in 2000. The exact number cannot be known because the census did not count them specifically. Bisexual and transgender populations were not counted, either, because there were no questions regarding this information. Also unavailable is the number of additional same-sex couples living under the same roof as the first, though this applies to additional heterosexual couples as well. The lack of accurate numbers makes it difficult for lawmakers who are considering legislation on hate crimes or social services for gay families with children. It also makes for less accuracy when predicting the fertility of a population.

Another issue that concerned gay rights advocates involved the automatic changing of data during the tabulation process. This automatic software data compiling method, called allocation, was designed to counteract mistakes and discrepancies in returned questionnaires. Forms that were filled out by two same-sex persons who checked the "Husband/wife" relationship box were treated as a discrepancy. The Census Bureau explained that same-sex "Husband/wife" data samples were changed to "unmarried partner" by computer processing methods in 99% of the cases. In the remaining 1%, computer systems used one of two possibilities: a) one of the two listed sexes was changed, making the partnership appear heterosexual, or b) if the two partners were more than 15 years apart in age, they might have been reassigned into a familial parent/child relationship. The process of automatic reassignment of same-sex marriage data was initiated so that the Census Bureau would not contravene the Defense of Marriage Act passed in 1996. The Act states:

With allocation moving married same-sex couples to the unmarried partner category, social scientists lost information that could have been extracted relating to the social stability of a same-gender couple who identify themselves as married.

References

Sources

 Constitution Article I Section II re Enumeration and Apportionment

Further reading
 .

External links

United States Census Bureau
 Census 2000 gateway
 Population Profile of the United States: 2000
 Population Profile Introductory slide show, in MS Powerpoint format
 State and County QuickFacts, the most requested information
 American FactFinder, for population, housing, economic, and geographic data
 2000 United States Census Form
 2001 U.S Census Report Contains 2000 census results

Other 2000 census websites
 MLA Language Map from the Modern Language Association
 How the Census Works via Howstuffworks.com

Census 2000
United States census
United States